John Francis Daley (born July 20, 1985) is an American actor, filmmaker, and musician. He is best known for playing high school freshman Sam Weir on the NBC comedy-drama Freaks and Geeks and FBI criminal profiler Dr. Lance Sweets on the crime drama series Bones, for which he was nominated for a 2014 PRISM Award. He plays keyboards and sings for the band Dayplayer.

Daley is also best known for his collaborative work with fellow writer and director Jonathan Goldstein, working on various films together. Daley and Goldstein's first work together was co-writing the comedy Horrible Bosses (2011), co-writers for The Incredible Burt Wonderstone (2013), co-story writing for Horrible Bosses 2 (2014), and co-writing/co-directing (in their directing debuts) the fifth film in the National Lampoon's Vacation film series, Vacation (2015). The duo were co-writers for Spider-Man: Homecoming (2017) with Jon Watts, Christopher Ford, Chris McKenna and Erik Sommers, and they co-directed the 2018 comedy Game Night.

Early life
Daley was born in the Chicago suburb of Wheeling, Illinois, to R.F. Daley, an actor, and Nancy Daley, a piano teacher. His father is of Irish Catholic background, while his mother is Jewish. He grew up in Nyack, New York, where he played Danny in Nyack Middle School's production of Grease.

Career
Daley began acting when he was cast as young Tommy in the U.S. and international tours of the Broadway hit The Who's Tommy. He played Sam Weir, protagonist of the "Geeks", in the television series Freaks and Geeks, and since then he has worked continuously in television, including series such as The Geena Davis Show, Boston Public, Regular Joe, Kitchen Confidential, Judging Amy, and Spin City. He was #94 on VH1's 100 Greatest Teen Stars.

In 2001, he co-directed a short film titled What Babies Do. He also wrote and starred in the comedy short Friday Night. In 2005, he appeared in the film Waiting... and in the Fox sitcom Kitchen Confidential. In 2007, Daley joined the cast of the Fox drama series Bones, portraying psychologist Lance Sweets. He co-wrote the season six episode "The Truth in the Myth" with his writing partner Jonathan Goldstein. Sweets was ultimately killed in the season 10 premiere; Bones executive producer Stephen Nathan said Sweets was killed because Daley wanted time off to direct a movie, and he was concerned that Daley's absence would be too long, especially if the directing job led to other jobs.

Daley was also featured in the music video for "Mercy Kiss" by Abandoned Pools.

In 2011, Daley and his writing partner Jonathan M. Goldstein wrote the black comedy Horrible Bosses. In 2013, Daley co-wrote The Incredible Burt Wonderstone with Goldstein; Daley also has a cameo in the film as a paramedic. In 2013, the two were hired to write Call of the Wild for DreamWorks Studios. John plays Ben House in Rapture-Palooza. Daley went on to write the story for the sequel to Horrible Bosses.

Daley and Goldstein co-wrote and co-directed the 2015 film Vacation, the latest installment of the National Lampoon's Vacation film series, starring Ed Helms and Christina Applegate.

Daley and Goldstein wrote the screenplay for the 2017 film Spider-Man: Homecoming with four other screenwriters, and were both considered to direct before Jon Watts was hired.

Daley and Goldstein directed the 2018 black comedy Game Night, based on a screenplay by Mark Perez. The film, starring Jason Bateman and Rachel McAdams, "earned a raft of glowing reviews for its whip-smart script, energetic performances, and deliberate avoidance of modern comedy's ubiquitous tropes," and grossed $117 million at the worldwide box office, versus a $37 million budget. While Daley and Goldstein did not receive screenwriter credit, they later said they rewrote "almost all of the original script's dialogue, totally overhauled the characters — most notably a creepy cop portrayed by Jesse Plemons — and comprehensively reworked the original script's third act."

In 2018, it was announced that the duo were set to direct a film adaptation of DC Comics' The Flash for their DC Extended Universe, but it was announced in July that they have left the project. Despite this, both Daley and Goldstein received story by credit alongside the film's screenwriter, Christina Hodson.

In July 2019, it was announced that Goldstein and Daley were entering early negotiations to direct the reboot of Dungeons & Dragons: Honor Among Thieves (2023). In January 2020, it was announced that, in addition to directing the film, Goldstein and Daley were also writing a new draft of the screenplay.

Filmography

Films

Short films

Television

Acting credits

Film

Television

References

External links

1985 births
Male actors from Illinois
American people of Irish descent
American male child actors
American male film actors
American male screenwriters
American male television actors
Comedy film directors
Jewish American male actors
Living people
People from Wheeling, Illinois
20th-century American male actors
21st-century American male actors
People from Nyack, New York
Jewish American writers
Male actors from New York (state)
Screenwriters from New York (state)
Screenwriters from Illinois
Sony Pictures Animation people
21st-century American Jews